Ry is a town with a population of 7,151 (1 January 2022) in central Denmark, located in Skanderborg municipality in Jutland. The town sprouted up around a railway station near the older town of Rye which is now much smaller than Ry.

Geography
Ry is located along the Gudenå (River Guden) between the lakes Gudensø, Birkesø, Vessø, Lillesø, Rye Møllesø and Knudsø.

Ry is known for Himmelbjerget one of the highest natural points in the Danish landscape. It is 147 m (482 ft) high.

Education 
Ry continuation school has won the girls school football tournament in Denmark 2005 and 2006. In 2006 Gudenå School, Ry held Smallschool Festival with more than 1,500 participants.

Notable people 
 Pauline Thomsen (1858 – 1931 in Ry) a Danish painter and art teacher; lived in Ry
 Maria Jacobsen (1882 in Siim near Ry – 1960) a Danish missionary and a key witness to the Armenian genocide
 Anna Klindt Sørensen (1899 in Ry – 1985) a Danish painter and illustrator, a strong, self-assured women who practised French Expressionism
 Ebbe Nielsen (1950 in Ry – 2001) a Danish entomologist, influential in systematics and Lepidoptera research
 Peter Sommer (born 1974) a Danish singer and songwriter, lives in Ry
 Jette Hansen (born 1987 in Ry) a female former Danish handball player
 Lars Frederiksen & The Bastards (active years 2000–2005) an American street punk band, Lars Frederiksen lives in Ry

References

External links
Official municipality Website

Cities and towns in the Central Denmark Region
Skanderborg Municipality